Phạm Thế Nhật (born 15 February 1991) is a Vietnamese footballer who plays as a defender for V.League 1 club Sông Lam Nghệ An and the Vietnam national football team.

Career 
Phạm Thế Nhật served as captain of the u-21 national team that played in a youth tournament in Malaysia, in which he was named the player of the tournament. In February 2017 in a cup match against Dak Lak, Phạm Thế Nhật punched and broke attacker Lê Trung Hiếu's nose during an off the ball altercation in the 87th minute. The referee did not see the incident but after the match, Phạm Thế Nhật was heavily fined and suspended by the VFN.

Personal life 
Phạm Thế Nhật was born in Hưng Nguyên. He is married to Vietnamese model and singer Trương Phương Thảo, then 24, whom he wed in December 2017.

References 

1991 births
Association football defenders
Living people
People from Nghệ An province
Song Lam Nghe An FC players
V.League 1 players
Vietnamese footballers
Can Tho FC players